Timothy Wallace, better known by his stage name Timbuktu, is a Canadian underground hip hop artist and member of the Backburner crew. He is a former member of the group Toolshed (with Chokeules, Psyborg and Selfhelp), and a member of the groups Wolves (with Bix, D-Sisive, Ghettosocks and Muneshine), Swamp Thing (with Chokeules and Savillion) and My Giants (with Ambition and Uncle Fester). He also makes up one half of the duos Teenburger (with Ghettosocks) and Sequestrians (with Chokeules).

Discography
Timbuktu
 Stranger Danger (2010)
 How Huge: The Legend of Howard Huge (2014)
 It’s Alright In the Daylight (2021)

Toolshed (Timbuktu with Chokeules, Psyborg & Selfhelp)
 Toolshed (2000)
 Clockwork Awkward (2000)
 Schemata (2002)
 Illustrated (2003)
 Relapse (2009)
 The Lost (2011)

Swamp Thing (Timbuktu with Chokeules & Savillion)
 The Grind House EP (2011)
 Creature Feature (2012)
 Firedogs (2013)
 Outer Limits (2014)
 Planet Murk (2015, entirely produced by Peter Project of Backburner) 
 Pray To Science (2016)
 Horse Power (2018)
 Cherry Mongoose (2019)

Teenburger (Timbuktu with Ghettosocks)
 Burgertime (2011)
 Hive Mind (TBA) (with The Herbaliser)

Backburner (Timbuktu with Ghettosocks, Jesse Dangerously, More or Les, Wordburglar, et al.)
 Heatwave (2011)
 Heatwave Remixes (2012)
 Eclipse (2015)

Other collaborations
 Get the Benjamins (2005) (with Chokeules, as Sequestrians)
 Wolves (2013) (with Bix, D-Sisive, Ghettosocks & Muneshine, as Wolves)

Compilations
 Train of Thought (2011) (with Ghettosocks, Muneshine & Jeff Spec)

Guest appearances
 Ghettosocks - "Ballz in Yo Stomach" from I Can Make Your Dog Famous (2008)
 Ghettosocks - "Rock the Discotech" from Treat of the Day (2009)
 Twin Peaks - "Heavy D" from Kissing Hands and Shaking Babies (2011)

See also

Canadian hip hop

References

External links 
 

Year of birth missing (living people)
Living people
Musicians from London, Ontario
Canadian male rappers
21st-century Canadian rappers
Underground rappers
21st-century Canadian male musicians